The 1975–76 WHA season was the fourth season of the World Hockey Association. After the Baltimore Blades and Chicago Cougars folded, the league stayed at 14 teams by adding the Cincinnati Stingers and Denver Spurs. In addition, the Vancouver Blazers franchise moved to Calgary and became the Cowboys. Midway through the season, the Spurs moved to Ottawa and became the Civics, though the team folded shortly thereafter when the sale of the franchise fell through. The Minnesota Fighting Saints became the second team to fold mid-season when the franchise was not financially successful, despite having a winning record at the time. Theoretically, fourteen teams would play 80 games each, but only twelve teams finished the season, with cancelled games involving the Civics or Saints being rescheduled on the fly, and four of five Canadian Division teams played 81 games, as a result.

Regular season

Final standings

+team started season in Western Division when playing in Denver; transferred by league to Canadian Division shortly after moving to Ottawa.

Player stats

Scoring leaders

GP = Games played; G = Goals; A = Assists; Pts = Points; PIM = Penalty minutes

Leading goaltenders
Bolded numbers indicate season leaders

GP = Games played; Min = Minutes played; W = Wins; L = Losses; T = Ties, GA = Goals against; GA = Goals against; SO = Shutouts; SV% = Save percentage; GAA = Goals against average

All-Star game
The 4th annual WHA All-Star Game featured a Canadian-based All-Star team vs a United States-based All-Star team, with the game taking place in Richfield Coliseum in Cleveland, Ohio. The Canadians won the game 6-1, with Real Cloutier and Paul Shmyr being named MVPs.

Avco World Trophy playoffs

The New England Whalers, Cleveland Crusaders, the Phoenix Roadrunners and the San Diego Mariners participated in Preliminary Rounds, with two teams advancing to the main bracket. The Whalers beat the Crusaders in three games, while the Mariners beat the Roadrunners in five games.

San Diego Mariners 3, Phoenix Roadrunners 2

New England Whalers 3, Cleveland Crusaders 0

AVCO World Trophy finals
(1) Winnipeg Jets VS. (1) Houston Aeros:
Jets sweep series 4-0
Game 1 (May 20) @ Houston:  Winnipeg 4, Houston 3
Game 2 (May 23) @ Houston:  Winnipeg 5, Houston 4
Game 3 (May 20) @ Winnipeg:  Winnipeg 6, Houston 3
Game 4 (May 23) @ Winnipeg:  Winnipeg 9, Houston 1

WHA awards

Trophies

All-Star Team

See also
1975 WHA Amateur Draft
1975 in sports
1976 in sports

References
HockeyDB

 
2
2
World Hockey Association seasons